Time Town was a theme park in Bolton Landing, New York. The park, built by Ted Yund, opened in 1970 and closed after the summer of 1981. The park was demolished and its 44-acre site was sold for housing.

Shows and attractions
Telescope observatory
Lion drinking fountain
Magic shows
Bumper cars
Laser light shows
Space Journey
Bear Jamboree (animatronics band)
SuperSlide
Pioneer Valley Scenic Railroad
Cave
Merry-go-round
Double astronaut statue

References

Defunct amusement parks in New York (state)
1970 establishments in New York (state)
1981 disestablishments in New York (state)
Tourist attractions in Warren County, New York
Amusement parks opened in 1970
Amusement parks closed in 1981